Kasper Kisum (born 20 August 1992) is a Danish handball player for RK Eurofarm Pelister. 

He played with the German champions league winner club SG Flensburg-Handewitt, starting from the 2014–15 season.

References

1992 births
Living people
Danish male handball players